Landerneau is a commune in the Finistère department of Brittany in north-western France.

The name is from Lan Terneo and can mean "(religious) enclosure of St Ténénan": allegedly a Welshman who also had  in the Vale of Clwyd in North Wales and in Somerset, and who moved to Brittany in the 7th century. Lann means a religious sacred place. The town has been founded by Saint Arnoc, some times called Ternoc and confusion can occur with Saint Ténénan. Some sources point Saint Arnoc and Saint Ténénan as the same person.
It was an important centre of the flax and linen industries in the 16th and 17th centuries. Landerneau is also the hometown of Édouard Leclerc, a businessman and entrepreneur who founded the French supermarket chain E.Leclerc in 1948. His first store applies a hard competition with other supermarket chains with local made products and lower prices. Leclerc's new methods of sales are still applied in all supermarkets and hypermarkets and marks an evolution in the market's history. The town is actually the heart of the agricultural market in northwest Brittany with several agribusiness companies headquarters located in the town.

A picturesque feature of the town centre is the sixteenth-century house-lined bridge (the Pont de Rohan) across the Elorn. The Pont de Rohan was the most downstream crossing of the Elorn River until 1930 and the construction of the Pont Albert Louppe near Brest.

The town is also known for its moon, La Lune de Landerneau (the Moon of Landerneau). This nickname is supposed from a noble visiting Versailles court and was not impressed by the luxury of the Château de Versailles. He was contemplating the moon with others in the Versailles gardens when he said "the Landerneau's moon is bigger", that made the assembly laugh. The Breton noble made reference to a big silver metal disc on top of the Saint Houardon Church, well known in the surroundings as "the moon of Landerneau".

International relations
Landerneau is twinned with the towns of Caernarfon in Gwynedd in Wales and Hünfeld in Germany.

Music festival 
Each year in August a music festival called "Fête du bruit dans Landerneau" takes place in Landerneau. "Fête du bruit dans Landerneau" means "festival of noise in Landerneau". When spoken it sounds identical to "faites du bruit dans Landerneau" which means "make some noise in Landerneau". This is a play on words based on the homophones "fête" and "faites". It also a play on words based on a French expression "Cela va faire du bruit dans Landerneau" meaning "That gonna make some noise in Landerneau". The origins of the expression is not clear. The first theory is from a 1796 theater drama, "Alexandre Duval's Les Héritiers", after a famous sailor declared dead is back to his hometown, Landerneau. "His death will make some noise in Landerneau" text said. The second theory is from the "Bagne de Brest" (Brest's Prison between 1749 and 1848). When a prisoner escapes, the prison's cannons were fired to alarm the area of the evasion. The noise of the canons could be heard from Landeneau, 22 kilometers (14 miles) away.

Population
Inhabitants of Landerneau are called in French Landernéens. It the 4th most populous commune of Finistère Departement.

Breton language
Landerneau has many bilingual signs (French and Breton), and is the first town where the indications in the local station were made bilingual, as a result of the Ya d'ar brezhoneg charter of the Ofis ar Brezhoneg.

The municipality launched a linguistic plan through Ya d'ar brezhoneg on 12 December 2004. In 2008, 12.46% of primary-school children attended bilingual schools.

Schools
There are eight (private and public) preschools and primary schools in the town, including a Diwan school, and two high schools.

Transport
 The town has its own bus transportation system named "Ar Bus" (The bus) and includes 6 lines. Buses are free of charge on Saturdays.
 Landerneau station is a stop on the Paris–Brest railway and the branch to Quimper. Near the Train Station, all local bus lines and departement bus lines connect at the "Gare Routière" (central bus station).
 The Town was the first in France to build a Square shaped roundabout in front of its Train Station, on Matthieu Donnart Place.
 The town is connected to RN 12; a trunk road connecting Landerneau to Brest and Paris via Departmental Road (D)770 that also links to the town of Daoulas at south, where the trunk road to Quimper is. The D770 can be a bypass from/to Quimper to the north coast (N165 <> N12) avoiding Brest surroundings.

See also
 Communes of the Finistère department
 Landerneau Parish close
List of the works of Bastien and Henry Prigent
List of the works of the Maître de Plougastel
St Thomas' Church

References

External links

  Official website
 

Communes of Finistère